Krzysztof Komarzewski (born 16 September 1998) is a Polish handball player for Wisła Płock and the Polish national team.

Career

National team
He made his debut for the national team on January 3, 2019, in a friendly match against Belarus (28:30). He threw his first five goals on January 5, 2019, in a match against Saudi Arabia (28:19).

References

1998 births
Living people
Polish male handball players
Wisła Płock (handball) players